Laya Gewog is a gewog (village block) of Gasa District, Bhutan. The capital of gewog is the town Laya. 

The gewog lies entirely within Jigme Dorji National Park and contains several of Bhutan's glaciers.

As well as the national language, Dzongkha, many locals speak Layakha.

The closure of the Tibetan border following the Chinese invasion of Tibet brought several changes to the area. Local people were no longer compelled to work as porters for Tibetan and Bhutanese officials, nobles, or religious figures from Gasa Dzong. Refugees from Tibet arrived with their yaks, which they sold off at low prices. Taxes on horses and yaks, which had been a disincentive to livestock production were reduced, and yak production increased.

References 

Gewogs of Bhutan
Gasa District